The Second Tschentscher senate is the current state government of Hamburg, sworn in on 10 June 2020 after Peter Tschentscher was elected as First Mayor by the members of the Hamburg Parliament. It is the 30th Senate of Hamburg.

It was formed after the 2020 Hamburg state election by the Social Democratic Party (SPD) and Alliance 90/The Greens (GRÜNE). Excluding the First Mayor, the senate comprises 11 ministers, called Senators. Six are members of the SPD, four are members of the Greens, and one is an independent politician.

Formation 

The previous Senate was a coalition government of the SPD and Greens led by First Mayor Peter Tschentscher.

The election took place on 23 February 2020, and resulted in losses for the SPD, while the Greens doubled their vote share and improved from third to second place. The opposition CDU recorded its worst ever result at 11%, while The Left remained steady on 9%. The AfD slipped to 5% and the FDP narrowly fell below the 5% electoral threshold, retaining only a single seat from a direct constituency.

First Mayor Tchentscher described discussions with the Greens as their "first priority", but said he was open to other possibilities; the Greens called for a renewal of the incumbent government. Post-election, the SPD held exploratory talks with both the Greens and CDU.

On 10 March, the SPD voted to begin coalition negotiations with the Greens. Discussions were interrupted by the COVID-19 pandemic, and postponed until resuming on 23 April. The two parties presented their coalition agreement on 2 June. It was approved by both the SPD and Greens congresses on 6 June.

Peter Tschentscher was elected as First Mayor by the Parliament on 10 June, winning 87 votes out of 123 cast.

Composition

References

External links

Cabinets of Hamburg
State governments of Germany
Cabinets established in 2020
2020 establishments in Germany